A female genital disease is a condition that affects the female reproductive system.

Background
Pathological mechanisms in the female reproductive system.

Classification by type of disease

Malformation
Malformations can be congenital.  They are classified by location of the malformation, such as uterine malformation.

Inflammation and/or infection
An example is oophoritis.

Classification by location
Alternatively, female genital diseases can be more strictly classified by location of the disease, which, in turn, can be broadly divided between diseases that affect the female internal genitalia and those that affect the female external genitalia.

References

Further reading

External links 

Gynaecologic disorders